David McLaughlin is an American writer, director and producer best known for co-writing the 1998 dramatic film Southie. In 2006 he directed, wrote and produced the independent feature On Broadway.

McLaughlin is a graduate of Boston College.

Filmography

References

External links
 

American film directors
American male screenwriters
Boston College alumni
Living people
Year of birth missing (living people)